Hoppo was the official Superintendent of Maritime Customs in the Qing dynasty

Hoppo may also refer to:
 Hoppo! (band)  name of Café Tacuba frontman Rubén Albarrán's side project
 Hoppo! (album) self-titled album from Café Tacuba frontman Rubén Albarrán
 Hoppo, animation character in children's show The Wuzzles
 Hoppo, one of the coven of witches in Thomas Middleton's The Witch (play) 1616

See also
Hu Bu (Chinese: 戶部), Ministry of Revenue of imperial China
Hoppo, the romanized Japanese name of Beipu in Taiwan during Japanese rule
 Hoppo Ryodo (Japanese: 北方領土) Northern Territories Kuril Islands dispute